CPH, CpH, Cph, or cph may refer to: 
Board Certified in Public Health (CPH), USA
 Cleveland Play House, US theatre
 In Copenhagen, Denmark:
CPH:PIX film festival
CPH:DOX film festival
 Copenhagen Airport, IATA code
 Champagne Airlines, ICAO code
 Chronic paroxysmal hemicrania, a type of headache
 Communistische Partij Holland, former Netherlands political party
 cph Deutschland, Chemie- Produktions- und Handelsgesellschaft mbH, adhesives company, Essen, Germany
 Concordia Publishing House, publisher of The Lutheran Church—Missouri Synod 
 CPH railmotor, a diesel train in Australia
 Cyclopentadiene, C5H6 (the cyclopentadienyl radical, C5H5, is often abbreviated Cp)